Hagensberg may refer to: 

 Āgenskalns, a district in Riga, Latvia
 Mount Hagen (volcano) (3,778 m), the second highest volcano in Papua New Guinea